Summer Hours is a 2008 French drama film written and directed by Olivier Assayas. It is the second in a series of films produced by the Musée d'Orsay, after Flight of the Red Balloon. In the film, two brothers and a sister witness the disappearance of their childhood memories when they must relinquish the family belongings after the death of their mother. The film was a critical triumph in the United States.

Plot
On a summer day in the country, at the home of  the widowed Hélène Berthier, who has dropped her married name of Marly, her three children, their spouses, and all her grandchildren assemble for her 75th birthday. Her preoccupation is over what will happen to the house and the valuable contents accumulated by her uncle Paul Berthier, who was a noted artist and to whom she was devoted. She hopes the children will decide amicably among themselves. 

Shortly after she dies, and the three heirs do not agree. While Frédéric, the eldest, wants to keep the house and contents as somewhere for the whole family, his two siblings just want a few mementoes and everything else turned into cash. Adrienne lives in New York with an American man, while Jérémie and his wife have made their home in China.

As Hélène made no legal provision, tax on the estate will be heavy and the lawyer suggests reducing it by donating artefacts to the State. The Musée d'Orsay agrees to take some precious items for its collection, following which the remaining contents are auctioned and the house sold. Before the new owners take over, Frédéric's daughter Sylvie asks all her school friends there for a final party and for one last time the place is full of happy young people. The faithful housekeeper takes fresh flowers to Hélène's grave.

Cast
Charles Berling as Frédéric Marly
Juliette Binoche as Adrienne Marly, Frédéric's younger sister
Jérémie Renier as Jérémie Marly, Frédéric younger brother
Édith Scob as Hélène Berthier
Dominique Reymond as Lisa Marly, wife of Frédéric
Valérie Bonneton as Angela Marly, wife of Jérémie
Isabelle Sadoyan as Éloïse, Hélène's faithful housekeeper
Alice de Lencquesaing as Sylvie Marly, Frédéric's elder child

Production
Principal photography began in Paris on 4 June 2007 and was completed on 27 July 2007. The film was known under the working titles Souvenirs du Valois and Printemps Passé.

Release
The film received its United States premiere on October 1, 2008, at the 46th New York Film Festival. The Criterion Collection released a special edition of the film on April 20, 2010.

Reception
Summer Hours was a critical triumph. It received 93% positive reviews on Rotten Tomatoes, and was one of the most highly decorated foreign-language films in the United States in 2009. The film won and was nominated for numerous critics' awards:

Boston Society of Film Critics Award for Best Foreign Language Film
New York Film Critics Circle Award for Best Foreign Language Film
Los Angeles Film Critics Association Award for Best Foreign Language Film
National Society of Film Critics Award for Best Foreign Language Film
Southeastern Film Critics Association Award for Best Foreign Language Film
Vancouver Film Critics Circle Awards
Chicago Film Critics Association Awards (nominated)
Washington D.C. Area Film Critics Association Award for Best Foreign Language film (nominated)
Houston Film Critics Society Awards (nominated)
Online Film Critics Society Awards (nominated)
Denver Film Critics Society (nominated)
Dallas-Fort Worth Film Critics Association Awards (nominated)

Édith Scob was nominated for a César Award for her portrayal of Hélène.

In 2017 the film was named the ninth "Best Film of the 21st Century So Far" by The New York Times.

References

External links

Summer Hours: A Time to Live and a Time to Die an essay by Kent Jones at the Criterion Collection

2008 drama films
Films directed by Olivier Assayas
2000s French-language films
French drama films
Musée d'Orsay
Films produced by Marin Karmitz
Films with screenplays by Olivier Assayas
2000s French films